Model 2 may refer to:

 Boeing Model 2, an American training seaplane designed in the 1910s
 Consolidated Model 2, a training airplane used by the United States Army Air Corps
 Data General Model 2, laptop by Data General
 Experimental Model 2 submachine gun, a Japanese submachine gun in service from 1935 to 1945
 Federal Signal Model 2, an outdoor warning siren produced by Federal Signal Corporation
 JSP model 2 architecture, a complex design pattern used in the design of Java Web applications
 Sega Model 2, an arcade system board by Sega in 1993
 Smith & Wesson Model 2, an American revolver produced from 1876 through 1911
 Type 92 Model 2 Fighter, an improved version of the Japanese Type 92 Fighter

See also
 Series 2 (disambiguation)
 M2 (disambiguation)
 MII (disambiguation)